Rapicactus subterraneus, synonym Turbinicarpus subterraneus, is a species of plant in the family Cactaceae. It is endemic to Mexico. Its natural habitat is hot deserts.

Subspecies
, Plants of the World Online accepted two subspecies:
Rapicactus subterraneus subsp. booleanus (G.S.Hinton) Lüthy, synonyms Rapicactus booleanus (G.S.Hinton) D.Donati, Turbinicarpus booleanus G.S.Hinton
Rapicactus subterraneus subsp. subterraneus

References

Sources
 Anderson, E.F., Fitz Maurice, W.A., Fitz Maurice, B., Hofer, A., Sotomayor, M., Arrendondo, A.G. & Sánchez, B. 2002.  Turbinicarpus subterraneus.   2006 IUCN Red List of Threatened Species.   Downloaded on 23 August 2007.

Cactoideae
Cacti of Mexico
Endemic flora of Mexico
Vulnerable plants
Endangered biota of Mexico
Taxonomy articles created by Polbot